Darra may refer to:

Places 

Darra, Queensland, a suburb of Brisbane, Australia
Darra, Swabi, a village in Swabi District, Pakistan
Darra Adam Khel, a town in Kohat District, Pakistan
Darra Pezu, a town in Lakki Marwat District, Pakistan

Other uses 
Darra (film), a 2016 Punjabi film
Darra Goldstein (born 1951), American professor
Darra (clipper), a tea-clipper, part of the ships' graveyard on Quail Island, New Zealand

See also
 Battle of Ain Darra, fought at Ain Dara, Lebanon
 Darra Khaibar, a Pakistani film
 Dara (disambiguation)